Hazarewal (Plural; Hazarewals, alternatively spelled as Hazara or Hazarawal) is term used for the multi-ethnic predominantly Hindko-speaking community belonging to the Hazara region of Khyber Pakhtunkhwa. Hindko speaking Hazarewals include the Swatis, Jadoons, Karlals, Abbasis, Sayyids, Awans, Mughals, Tanolis, Turks, Qureshis and Khokhars. A large number of Hindko speakers in Hazara Division are also Pashtuns. Majority of these Pashtuns speak Hindko as their mother tongue and do not speak the Pashto language anymore. These Hindko speaking Pashtun Hazarewals include the Tahirkhelis, Swatis, Yusufzais, Jadoons, Dilazaks and Tareens. The Hazarewal or Hindkowans, are not to be confused with the ethnic Hazara people inhabiting parts of Balochistan province in Pakistan or areas of neighbouring Afghanistan. The Hazarewals have, over the last few years, found themselves increasingly in favour of separation and autonomy from the rest of Khyber Pakhtunkhwa province on linguistic basis.

See also 
  List of notable Hazarewals

References

Hindkowan people
Ethnic groups in Pakistan
Social groups of Pakistan